New Music of Alec Wilder is an album by American jazz guitarist Mundell Lowe and his orchestra featuring compositions by Alec Wilder recorded in 1956 for the Riverside label.

Reception

Allmusic awarded the album 3 stars with its review by Scott Yanow calling it "A nice vehicle for an 11-piece group".

Track listing
All compositions by Alec Wilder
 "Suggestion for Bored Dancers" - 1:48 
 "She Never Wore Makeup" - 3:42 
 "What Happened Last Night?" - 2:08 
 "Walk Softly" - 2:48 
 "Let's Get Together and Cry" - 2:34 
 "Mama Never Dug This Scene" - 1:31 
 "Pop, What's a Passacaglia?" - 2:25 
 "No Plans" - 2:38 
 "The Endless Quest" - 2:47 
 "Around the World in 2:34" - 2:35 
 "An Unrelenting Memory" - 3:13 
 "Tacet for Neurotics" - 2:12 
Recorded at Reeves Sound Studios in New York City on June 12, 1956 (tracks 3, 4, 9 & 12) June 19, 1956 (tracks 5, 7, 8 & 11) and July 3, 1956 (tracks 1, 2, 6 & 10)

Personnel 
Mundell Lowe - guitar  
Joe Wilder - trumpet
John Barrows, Jim Buffington - French horn
Don Hammond - flute
Jerry Roth - oboe
Bernard Garfield (tracks 1-4, 6, 9, 10 & 12), Harold Goltzer (tracks 5, 7, 8 & 11) - bassoon
Jimmy Carroll - clarinet, bass clarinet
Trigger Alpert (tracks 3-5, 7-9, 11 & 12), Milt Hinton (tracks 1, 2, 6 & 10) - bass
Ed Shaughnessy - drums

References 

 

1956 albums
Mundell Lowe albums
Albums produced by Orrin Keepnews
Riverside Records albums